Kissoon is a surname of Hindu Indo-Caribbean origin. It is derived from Kishun or Kishan, which in Caribbean Hindustani the "h" is silent, thus resulting is Kissoon. Kissoon is another name for the Hindu deity Krishna. Notable people with the surname include:

 Freddie Kissoon (born 1951), Guyanese journalist
 Jeffery Kissoon (born 1947), Trinidadian actor
 Mac and Katie Kissoon, Trinidadian male and female vocal duo

Indian surnames
Surnames of Indian origin
Hindustani-language surnames
Hindu surnames